Dolenje Dole is a small settlement in the Municipality of Škocjan in southeastern Slovenia. Within the municipality, it belongs to the Village Community of Dole. The area is part of the historical region of Lower Carniola and is now included in the Southeast Slovenia Statistical Region.

References

External links
Dolenje Dole at Geopedia

Populated places in the Municipality of Škocjan